R372 road may refer to:
 R372 road (Ireland)
 R372 road (South Africa)